Nissrine Brouk, sometimes written Nisrine Brouk, is a Moroccan karateka. She won the gold medal in the women's 68kg event at the 2019 African Games held in Rabat, Morocco.

In 2021, she competed in the women's 68kg event at the World Karate Championships held in Dubai, United Arab Emirates. She was eliminated in the repechage by eventual bronze medalist Alizée Agier of France.

She won one of the bronze medals in the women's 68kg event at the Mediterranean Games held in Oran, Algeria. She also won one of the bronze medals in the women's 68kg event at the 2021 Islamic Solidarity Games held in Konya, Turkey.

Achievements

References

External links 
 

Living people
Year of birth missing (living people)
Place of birth missing (living people)
Moroccan female karateka
African Games medalists in karate
African Games gold medalists for Morocco
Competitors at the 2019 African Games
Competitors at the 2022 Mediterranean Games
Mediterranean Games medalists in karate
Mediterranean Games bronze medalists for Morocco
Islamic Solidarity Games medalists in karate
Islamic Solidarity Games competitors for Morocco
21st-century Moroccan women